Nowakiida is an extinct order of free living animals from the Dacryoconarida subclass.

References

External links 
 Dacryoconarida at fossilworks

Tentaculita
Devonian animals
Devonian first appearances
Devonian extinctions